Brigachtal is a municipality in the district of Schwarzwald-Baar in Baden-Württemberg in Germany.

References

Schwarzwald-Baar-Kreis